Sorin Alexandrescu (born 18 August 1937) is a Romanian-born academic, literary critic, semiotician, linguist, essayist, and translator.

Born in Bucharest as the son of Constantin, a magistrate, and Ileana, Mircea Eliade's sister, he graduated from the "Mihai Viteazu" High School in his hometown (1955), and after that, from the Faculty of Letters, University of Bucharest (1959). After teaching comparative literature at the University of Bucharest, where he was considered to be a structuralist, he was sent in 1969 by the Romanian authorities to teach Romanian language and literature at universities in Amsterdam and Groningen. In 1974 he decided to defect.

In 1976, he founded the International Journal of Roumanian Studies.

During the 1989 Romanian Revolution, he returned to Romania as a correspondent for a Dutch newspaper.

In 1998, he was named presidential adviser for culture. In 2001, he settled permanently in Romania again. That same year, he was one of the founders of the so-called Centrul de Excelență în Studiul Imaginii at the University of Bucharest, together with Dan Grigorescu, Mihai Zamfir, Laura Mesina, Vlad Alexandrescu, Vasile Morar and Zoe Petre.

Books 
 The Logic of Personages, 1973
 Logique du personnage: reflexions sur l'univers faulknerien, (1974)
 Dimitrie Cantemir: Roemeens historicus en politicus 1673-1723, Bussum 1975
 Transformational grammar and the Rumanian language, 1977
 Richard Rorty, 1995
 Figurative of the Art. Beginning and End. 20th Century in Romania, 1998
 Paradoxul român, 1998
 Identitate în ruptură. Mentalitati românești postbelice, 2000
 La modernité a l'Est. 13 aperçus sur la literature roumaine, 2000

References

External links 
 Articles by Sorin Alexandrescu in Observator cultural 
 Centrul Cultural Pitești 
 Sorin Alexandrescu în oglinda Occidentului, Solomon Marcus, Observator cultural - numărul 126, iulie 2002 
 Mircea Eliade – identitate în ruptură, Carmen Mușat, Observator cultural - numărul 338, septembrie 2006 

Interviews
 „Nu numai în cultura romană, ci și pentru ea” (I). Interviu cu Sorin Alexandrescu, Raluca Alexandrescu, Observator cultural - numărul 52, februarie 2001 
 „Nu numai în cultura romană, ci și pentru ea” (II). Interviu cu Sorin Alexandrescu, Raluca Alexandrescu, Observator cultural - numărul 53, februarie 2001 
 Cultura bate criza!, Carmen Mușat, Observator cultural - numărul 547, octombrie 2010 

1937 births
University of Bucharest alumni
Romanian literary critics
Dutch academics
Romanian translators
Romanian essayists
Linguists from Romania
Linguists from the Netherlands
Romanian expatriates in the Netherlands
Romanian defectors
Communication scholars
Structuralists
Academic staff of the University of Bucharest
Living people
20th-century translators
20th-century essayists